Olin is an unincorporated community located in Olin Township, Iredell County, North Carolina, United States. The  Olin post office was first established in 1852 and continues to operate with a ZIP code 28660.

History

The Olin Creek, also knowns as the Middle Fork of Rocky Creek, is near were the New Institute post office was established on August 12, 1852.  On February 14, 1856, this post office was re-named the Olin post office.  It was named for Stephen A. Olin, founder and first president of Randolph-Macon college (1832-1836).  The town of Olin had a prohibition of the manufacture and sale of liquor written into its charter.  The first postmaster of Olin was William D. Watts (February 14, 1856).  After Olin Township was established in 1868, Olin remained a town.

The following are or have been located in Olin:
 Olin United Methodist Church and Cemetery, founded in 1851

References

Unincorporated communities in Iredell County, North Carolina
Unincorporated communities in North Carolina